Hydrovatus seminarius, is a species of predaceous diving beetle found in India, Bangladesh, Bhutan, Myanmar, Nepal, Pakistan, Sri Lanka, China, Indonesia, Japan, Laos, Malaysia, Taiwan, Thailand, Vietnam and Australian region.

This large species has a typical length of about 2.4 to 2.8 mm. Head between eyes narrowly margined. In male genitalia, the apical part of penis is evenly curved ventrally. Male stridulation apparatus on metacoxal plates along suture close to metathorax.

References 

Dytiscidae
Insects of Sri Lanka
Insects described in 1859